Taikan may refer to:

Yokoyama Taikan (1868 – 1958), a Japanese painter
Kokka Taikan, a compilation of Japanese waka poetry
Taikan Range, a mountain chain in the Russian Far East